The Anglican Diocese of the Rocky Mountains is a diocese of the Anglican Church in North America. In 2021, the diocese had 28 parishes in the American states of Colorado, Wyoming, Montana, Arizona, Idaho, Missouri, California, Oregon, Washington, Ohio, South Dakota, New Jersey and Hawaii. The state with most parishes is Colorado, with 9. The diocese's first bishop is Ken Ross.

History
The Anglican Diocese of the Rocky Mountains traces his origins to the Anglican Mission in the Americas, started as a missionary movement of the Province of the Anglican Church of Rwanda in the United States and Canada, in 2000. The AMiA was a founding member of the Anglican Church in North America, in June 2009, it later would become an associate member and would eventually leave, in December 2011. Most of their parishes decided to create the PEARUSA, as the new missionary district of the Province of the Anglican Church of Rwanda, also a dual member of the ACNA, since June 2012. PEARUSA had three regional networks, Mid-Atlantic and Northeast, West and Southeast. It was decided that all the three regional networks of PEARUSA would join the ACNA at the Synod of the Province of the Anglican Church of Rwanda, at 23 September 2015. The Provincial Council of ACNA, at 21 June 2016, decided that the two regional networks of Mid-Atlantic and Northeast, and West would become two new dioceses, the Anglican Diocese of Christ Our Hope and the Anglican Diocese of the Rocky Mountains, originated from the regional network of the West. The first bishop of the new diocese would be Ken Ross.

While mainly concentrated to the Rocky Mountain region, the diocese is spread across the United States and one of his main purposes is church planting.

References

External links
Anglican Diocese of the Rocky Mountains Official Website

Dioceses of the Anglican Church in North America
Anglican dioceses established in the 21st century
Anglican realignment dioceses
Religion in Oregon